The Tholsel, Dublin was an important building which combined the function of civic hall, guildhall, court and gaol. It was located on Skinners Row within the old city walls of Dublin, Ireland. It existed in various forms from after the Norman invasion of Ireland until it was finally demolished around 1809. It was one of the most important and imposing buildings in medieval Dublin and was a secular focal point within the city walls situated at a major crossroads close to Dublin Castle, St Patrick's Cathedral and Christchurch Cathedral. It was the first of several tholsels which were constructed in the major cities and towns of late medieval Ireland and the Dublin tholsel also housed the first public clock in Ireland on its tower from 1466.

History

There are mentions of the tholsel as far back as 1311 being called the 'new' tholsel, indicating an earlier building had probably been constructed sometime after Henry II had granted Dublin to his men in 1164.

In 1343, the tholsel is again mentioned when there was a charter granted by Edward III which set an exemption from the portion of tolls due to the King so that the burghers of the city could repair the building.

In 1395, Gerardus Van Raes was appointed keeper of the Dublin Tholsel for life. He was granted the keep of both the upper and lower gaol in that tholsel indicating an increasing number of prisoners. The upper keep was usually reserved for debtors while the lower keep was for felons and more serious criminals.

In 1590, Archbishop of Dublin Adam Loftus addressed the lord mayor and Corporation of Dublin at the tholsel and requested the use of the old priory at All Hallows to establish a university. He was granted permission and two years later he established Trinity College Dublin on the site.

In 1597, the condition of the building, already weakened by a great cleft in the eastern flank, deteriorated under the force of the Dublin gunpowder explosion.

From 1641-48 the Parliament of Ireland met at the tholsel. The parliament was transferred here from the Castle because some of the parliamentarians were suspected to sympathise with the rebels and might try to seize the castle, which held important stores of weapons and munitions.

Voting in the 1713 Irish general election took place at the Tholsel (then considered a Whig stronghold), rather than at the Blue Coat School, setting off a chain of events which lead to the Dublin election riot.

In 1775, in an address to King George III, 3,000 freemen of Dublin assembled at the tholsel to urge a conciliatory policy towards the American colonists, in order to ensure peace between Britain and the American colonies.

In 1988, the site was repurposed as a park named the Peace Park.

The building from 1682 - 1809

The last tholsel building was completed around 1681 and was finally occupied by Dublin Corporation and the Merchants' Guild in 1682. It is unknown who designed the building although various masons including a William Rothery are recorded as having worked on it at various stages. In 1683, the exchange of Dublin was transferred from Cork House to the tholsel.

In his study of Protestant Dublin in the seventeenth and eighteenth centuries, Robin Usher describes the building as roughly square in plan and abutted on one side by houses. The elevations consisted of an arcaded ground storey, open to the elements on the north and western sides with a fenestrated piano nobile above. The city assembly and the board of alderman met in richly ornamented rooms over the ground floor loggia, itself fitted out as the merchants’ exchange. Two statues sculpted by William De Keysar depicting King Charles II, and his brother, James Duke of York, along with the royal coat of arms faced the building to the front.

The tholsel features as one of the most notable of the 25 illustrations in James Malton's  A Picturesque and Descriptive View of the City of Dublin and is one of the few structures depicted which does not remain standing as of 2020. The building is shown facing directly onto Skinner's Row at the corner of Nicholas Street near the Church of St. Nicholas Within with an adjacent lane named Ram Alley running alongside as well as the property of Robert Thomas, Tallow Chandler at 1 Skinner's Row. Records indicate that this was historically accurate with the business of Robert Thomas in situ at the adjacent property around the time of Malton's illustration in 1791. The illustration shows the building without a tower, cupola or weather vane which had all been lost in the previous decades as the building gradually degraded and fell out of functional use.

Its ultimate demise came with the construction of the Royal Exchange and the migration of all major trade and mercantile operations to this more grand and spacious commercial building in the late 18th century. The only portions of the structure which still exist are the royal coat of arms and two front statues which were removed to the crypt of the nearby Christchurch Cathedral prior to demolition where they remain open for public viewing as of 2020.

Various plans for replacements were drawn up with a site at the old Custom House on Essex Quay earmarked for a new design by Benjamin Eaton in 1797 while another design by Richard Johnston in 1805 was proposed for further upriver alongside a new marshalsea.

Clerks of the Tholsel
The Clerk of the Tholsel or Town Clerk was one of only two elected officials of Dublin Corporation, the other being the Recorder of Dublin.

List of Clerks of the Tholsel

See also
 Church of St. Nicholas Within, Dublin
 Church of St Nicholas Without, Dublin
 St. Werburgh's Church, Dublin
 Dick's Coffee House

Notes

References 
 – 1660 to 1690

Government buildings in the Republic of Ireland
City and town halls in the Republic of Ireland
Buildings and structures in Dublin (city)
Demolished buildings and structures in Dublin
Guildhalls in Dublin (city)
Baroque architecture in Ireland
Buildings and structures demolished in 1809